Ronel Van Wyk (born 19 August 1978) is a South African former professional racing cyclist. She won the South African National Road Race Championships on three occasions.

References

External links
 

1978 births
Living people
South African female cyclists
Sportspeople from Bloemfontein
White South African people